True is the debut album by New Zealand band, TrinityRoots, released in 2001. The album peaked at number 21 in New Zealand.

Track listing
"True"
"Sense and Cents"
"Beautiful People"
"Call to You"
"Passion"
"D By D"
"Egos"
"Just Like You"
"Little Things"

Charts

References

TrinityRoots albums
2001 debut albums